Roy Howard Arbogast (born September 5, 1941) is an American special effects artist. He was nominated for an Academy Award in the category Best Visual Effects for the film Close Encounters of the Third Kind.

Selected filmography 
 Close Encounters of the Third Kind (1977; co-nominated with Douglas Trumbull, Matthew Yuricich, Greg Jein and Richard Yuricich)

References

External links 

1941 births
Living people
People from Hill County, Montana
Special effects people
Special effects coordinators